Moosbach is a river of Bavaria, Germany. It is the natural outflow of the Seehamer See, and flows into the Mangfall near Valley.

See also
List of rivers of Bavaria

Rivers of Bavaria
Rivers of Germany